The Troyville culture is an archaeological culture in areas of Louisiana and Arkansas in the Lower Mississippi valley in the Southeastern Woodlands. It was a Baytown Period culture and lasted from 400 to 700 CE during the Late Woodland period. It was contemporaneous with the Coastal Troyville and Baytown cultures (all three had evolved from the Marksville Hopewellian peoples) and was succeeded by the Coles Creek culture. Where the Baytown peoples built dispersed settlements, the Troyville people instead continued building major earthwork centers.

Subsistence
The Troyville-Coles Creek people lived on gathered wild plants and local domesticates, and maize was of only minor importance.  Acorns, persimmons, palmetto, maygrass, and squash were all more important than maize. Tobacco was cultivated as well, and protein came from deer and smaller mammals, but the bounty of the region kept maize from being adopted as a staple until as late as the thirteenth century CE.

Known Troyville culture sites

See also
Culture, phase, and chronological table for the Mississippi Valley

References

External links

 
Late Woodland period
Archaeological cultures of North America
4th-century establishments
8th-century disestablishments in North America